Climate communication or climate change communication is a field of environmental communication and science communication focused on the causes, nature and effects of anthropogenic climate change.

Research in the field emerged in the 1990s and has since grown and diversified to include studies concerning the media, conceptual framing, and public engagement and response. Since the late 2000s, a growing number of studies have been conducted in developing countries and have been focused on climate communication with marginalized populations.

Most research focuses on raising public knowledge and awareness, understanding underlying cultural values and emotions, and bringing about public engagement and action. Major issues include familiarity with the audience, barriers to public understanding, creating change, audience segmentation, changing rhetoric, public health, storytelling, media coverage, and popular culture.

History 

In "Climate Change Communication” (from Oxford's Communications Research Encyclopedia), communications scholar Amy E. Chadwick identifies Climate Change Communication as a new field of scholarship that truly emerged in the 1990s. In the late 80s and early 90s, research in developed countries (e.g. the United States, New Zealand, and Sweden) was largely concerned with studying the public's perception and comprehension of climate change science, models, and risks and guiding further development of communication strategies. These studies showed that while the public was aware of and beginning to notice climate change effects (increasing temperatures and changing precipitation patterns), the public's understanding of climate change was interlinked with ozone depletion and other environmental risks but not human-produced  emissions. This understanding was coupled with varied yet overall increased net concern that continued through the mid-2000s. In studies from the mid-2000s to the late 2000s, there is evidence of rising global skepticism despite growing consensus and evidence of increasingly polarized views due to climate change's growing use as a political "litmus test." In 2010, researcher Susanne C. Moser viewed both the expansion of climate change communication's focus, which began to include subjects such as materialized evidence of climate change effects in addition to science and policy, as well as more prolific conversation/communication from a variety of voices as increasing climate change's relevance to society. Surveys through the mid-2010s showed mixed concern for climate change depending on global region —notably consistent concern in developed Western countries but a trend towards global unconcern in countries such as China, Mexico, and Kenya. In 2016, Moser noted an increase in the total number of climate communication studies in both Westernized countries and the Global South and an increased focus on climate communication with indigenous peoples and other marginalized communities since 2010. As of 2017, research remained focused on public understanding and had since begun to also analyze the relevance of the media, conceptual framing, public engagement and response, and persuasive strategies. This expansion has legitimated climate change communication as its own academic field and has yielded a group of experts specific to it.

Primary goals of climate communication 

Most climate communication and research within the field is concerned with (1) the mechanisms related to the public's understanding/awareness of and perception of climate change which are intertwined with (2) personal cultural values and emotions related to social norms and (3) how these components can influence the engagement and action that may emerge as a response to communication. Within the academic field, there are debates over which is more important: knowledge-based communication or emotion-driven communication. Though both are inherently linked to action, researchers often view increased understanding as leading to increased action. A 2020 study by Kris De Meyer et al. attempts to push back against that notion and argues that action produces belief.

Analyzing and increasing public understanding and perception 
One line of climate communication study is concerned with analyzing public understanding and risk perception. Understanding public perception of risk and its relevant influences, as well as public knowledge, concern, consensus, and imagery is thought to help policymakers better address the concerns of constituents and inform further climate communication. This notion has opened the realm of climate communications to political communications, sociology, and psychology. Achieving increased public understanding is often associated with communicating levels of scientific consensus and other scientific facts or futures in order to spur action and address the "information-deficit" model but can also be related to connecting with values and emotions. Perception is often related to personal recognition to impacted locations, times (the present vs. the future), weather events, or economics, which has placed emphasis on different methods of framing (linking concepts) and rhetoric when communicating. These methods of communication presently include scientific communication, knowledge transfer, social media, news media, and entertainment amongst others, which are also studied individually regarding climate change.

Connecting to values and emotions 
In addition to studies regarding knowledge, climate communication researchers inspect existing values and emotions related to climate change and how they are impacted by various communication strategies and can influence the effects of communication modes. Understanding and relating to the audiences' moral, cultural, religious, and political values, identities, and emotions (like fear) are viewed as imperative to appropriate and effective communication because climate change can otherwise seem intangible due to uncertainty and distance (physical, social, temporal). Recognizing and understanding these values is key to impacting perception of climate science and mitigative action because values serve as filters through which information is processed. Emotional reactions to climate change and the role emotions can play in decision-making have encouraged researchers to study the emotional side of climate change. Appeals to emotions (such as fear and hope) and to values can also be used in communication strategies. It is unclear whether negative emotions (e.g. concern and fear) or positive emotions (e.g. hope) better promote climate change action. Emotions can also be analyzed by their level of pleasantness and/or to the extent they evoke action, which is often understudied.

Producing engagement and action 
Studying climate communications can also be focused on civic engagement and the production of behavior changes for adapting or increasing resiliency to climate change. Engagement and action can occur on multiple geographic scales (local, regional, national, or international), and examples include participation in climate justice movements, support for policies or politics, changes to agricultural practices, and addresses to vulnerabilities to extreme weather vulnerabilities. Behavioral changes can also address more fundamental norms and values that influence lifestyles, life choices, and society as a whole. Engagement can also involve how those who communicate climate change interact with researchers studying the field of communications. Studies have recognized that increased understanding and perception does not automatically produce action and have argued for increased means of enabling action in communication methods. Research into engagement and action often focuses on the perception and understanding of different demographics and geographic locations. Some politicians, such as Arnold Schwarzenegger with his slogan "terminate pollution", say that activists should generate optimism by focusing on the health co-benefits of climate action.

Major issues

Barriers to understanding 

Climate communications is heavily focused on methods for inviting larger scale public action to address climate change. To this end, a lot of research focuses on barriers to public understanding and action on climate change. Scholarly evidence shows that the information deficit model of communication—where climate change communicators assume  "if the public only knew more about the evidence they would act"—doesn't work. Instead, argumentation theory indicates that different audiences need different kinds of persuasive argumentation and communication. This is counter to many assumptions made by other fields such as psychology, environmental sociology, and risk communication.

Additionally, climate denialism by organizations, such as The Heartland Institute in the United States, and individuals introduces misinformation into public discourse and understanding.

There are several models for explaining why the public doesn't act once more informed. One of the theoretical models for this is the 5 Ds model created by Per Epsten Stoknes. Stoknes describes 5 major barriers to creating action from climate communication:

 Distance – many effects and impacts of climate change feel distant from individual lives
 Doom - when framed as a disaster, the message backfires, causing Eco-anxiety
 Dissonance – a disconnect between the problems (mainly the fossil fuel economy) and the things that people choose in their lives
 Denial -- psychological self defense to avoid becoming overwhelmed by fear or guilt
 iDentity -- disconnects created by social identities, such as conservative values, which are threatened by the changes that need to happen because of climate change.

In her book Living in Denial: Climate Change, Emotions, and Everyday Life, Kari Norgaard's study of Bygdaby—a fictional name used for a real city in Norway—found that non-response was much more complex than just a lack of information. In fact, too much information can do the exact opposite because people tend to neglect global warming once they realize there is no easy solution. When people understand the complexity of the issue, they can feel overwhelmed and helpless which can lead to apathy or skepticism.

Climate literacy 
Though communicating the science about climate change under the premises of an Information deficit model of communication is not very effective in creating change, comfort with and literacy in the main issues and topics of climate change is important for changing public opinion and action. Several agencies and educational organizations have developed frameworks and tools for developing climate literacy, including the Climate Literacy Lab at Georgia State university, and National Oceanic and Atmospheric Administration.  Such resources in English have been collected by the Climate Literacy and Awareness Network.

Creating change 
As of 2008, most of the environmental communications evidence for effecting individual or social change were focused on behavior changes around: household energy consumption, recycling behaviours, changing transportation behavior and buying green products. At that time, there were few examples of multi-level communications strategies for effecting change.

Behaviour change 

Since much of Climate communication is focused on engaging broad public action, much of the studies are focused on effecting behavior change. Typically, effective climate communication has three parts: cognitive, affective and place based appeals.

Audience segmentation 

Different parts of different populations respond differently to climate change communication. Academic research since 2013 has seen an increasing number of audience segmentation studies, to understand different tactics for reaching different parts of populations. Major segmentation studies include:

  Segmentation of the American audiences into 6 groups: Alarmed, Concerned, Cautious, Disengaged, Doubtful and Dismissive.
  Segmentation of Australians into 4 segments in 2011, and 6 segments analogous to the Six America's model.
  Segmentation of German populations into 5 segments
  Segmentation of Indian populations into the 6 segments
  Segmentation of Singapore audiences into 3 segments

Changing rhetoric 
A significant part of the research and public advocacy conversations about climate change have focused on the effectiveness of different terms used to describe "global warming".

History of global warming

Health 
Climate change exacerbates a number of existing public health issues, such as mosquito-borne disease, and introduces new public health concerns related to changing climate, such as increase in health concerns after natural disasters or increases in heat illnesses. Thus the field of health communication has long acknowledged the importance of treating climate change as a public health issue, requiring broad population behavior changes that allow societal climate change adaptation. A December 2008 article in the American Journal of Preventive Medicine recommended using two broad sets of tools to effect this change: communication and social marketing. A 2018 study, found that even with moderates and conservatives who were skeptical of the importance of climate change, exposure to information about the health impacts of climate change creates greater concern about the issues. Climate change is also expected to impact mental health significantly. With the increase in emotional responses to climate change, there is a growing need for greater resilience and tolerance to emotional experiences. Research has indicated that these emotional experiences can be adaptive when they are supported and processed appropriately. This support requires the facilitation of emotional processing and reflective functioning. When this occurs, individuals increase in tolerance to emotion and resilience, and are then able to support others through crisis.

Importance of Storytelling 
Framing climate change information as a story has been shown to be an effective form of communication. In a 2019 study, climate change narratives structured as stories were better at inspiring pro-environmental behavior. The researchers propose that these climate stories spark action by allowing each experimental subject to process the information experientially, increasing their affective engagement and leading to emotional arousal. Stories with negative endings, for example, influenced cardiac activity, increasing inter-beat (RR) intervals. The story signalled the brain to be alert and take action against the threat of climate change.

A similar study has shown that sharing personal stories about experiences with climate change can convince climate skeptics. Hearing about how climate change has influenced someone's life elicits emotions like worry and compassion, which can shift beliefs about climate change.

Media coverage 

The effect of mass media and journalism on the public's attitudes towards climate change has been a significant part of communications studies. In particular, scholars have looked at how the media's tendency to cover climate change in different cultural contexts, with different audiences or political positions (for example Fox News's dismissive coverage of climate change news), and the tendency of newsrooms to cover climate change as an issue of uncertainty or debate, in order to give a sense of balance.

Popular culture 

Further research has explored how popular media, like the film The Day After Tomorrow, popular documentary An Inconvenient Truth, and climate fiction change public perceptions of climate change.

Effective climate communication 
Effective climate communications require audience and contextual awareness. Different organizations have published guides and frameworks based on experience in climate communications. This section documents those various guidelines.

General guidance 
A 2009 handbook developed by the Center for Research on Environmental Decisions at the Earth Institute at Columbia University describes eight main principles for communications based on the psychological research about Environmental decisions:

 Know your audience
 Get the Audience's Attention
 Translate Scientific Data into Concrete Experiences
 Beware the Overuse of Emotional Appeals
 Address Scientific and Climate Uncertainties
 Tap into Social Identities and Affiliates
 Encourage Group Participation
 Make Behavior Change Easier
A strategy playbook, developed based on lessons learned from the COVID pandemic communication, was released On Road Media in the UK in 2020. The framework is focused on developing positive messages that help people feel optimistic about learning more to address climate change. This framework included six recommendations:

 Make it do-able and show change is possible
 Focus on the big things and how we can change them
 Normalize action and change, not inaction
 Connect the planet's health with our own health
 Emphasis our shared responsibility for future generations
 Keep it down to earth

By experts 
In 2018, the IPCC published a handbook of guidance for IPCC authors about effective climate communication. It is based on extensive social studies research exploring the impact of different tactics for climate communication. The guidelines focus on six main principles:

 Be a confident communicator
 Talk about the real world, not abstract ideas
 Connect with what matters to your audience
 Tell a human story
 Lead  with what you know
 Use the most effective visual communication

Visuals 
Climate Visuals a nonprofit, published in 2020 a set of guidelines based on evidence for climate communications. They recommend that visual communications include:

 Show real people
 Tell new stories
 Show climate change causes at scale
 Show emotionally powerful impacts
 Understand your audience
 Show local (serious) impacts
 Be careful with protest imagery.

Applying findings from psychology 
Psychologists have increasingly been assisting the worldwide community in facing the difficult challenge of organizing effective climate change mitigation efforts. Much work has been done on how to best communicate climate related information so that it has positive psychological impact, leading to people engaging in the problem, rather than evoking psychological defenses like denial, distance or a numbing sense of doom.

As well as advising on the method of communication, psychologists have investigated the difference it make when the right sort of person is doing the communication – for example, when addressing American conservatives, climate related messages have been shown to be received more positively if delivered by former military officers. Various people who are not primarily psychologists have also been advising on psychological matters related to climate change. For example, Christiana Figueres and Tom Rivett-Carnac, who led the efforts to organize the unprecedentedly successful 2015 Paris Agreement, have since campaigned to spread the view that a "stubborn optimism" mindset should ideally be part of an individual's psychological response to the climate change challenge.

A study from 2020 found that persuasive messaging that explains the mechanisms behind climate change, rather than the risks or consequences of climate change, was more effective in changing beliefs, especially among conservatives.

Sustainable development 
The impacts of climate change are exacerbated in low- and middle income countries; higher levels of poverty, less access to technologies, and less education, means that this audience needs different information. The Paris Agreement and IPCC both acknowledge the importance of sustainable development in addressing these differences. In 2019 the nonprofit, Climate and Development Knowledge Network published a set of lessons learned and guidelines based on their experience communicating climate change in Latin America, Asia and Africa.

Organizations 
Research centers in climate communication include:
 Yale Program on Climate Change Communication
 Center for Climate Change Communication at George Mason University
 Climate Outreach (UK)
 Climate Commission (Australia)

Other bodies that research climate communication

 International Organizations
 the Intergovernmental Panel on Climate Change (IPCC)
 the UN Climate Change Secretariat

NGOs

 Climate and Development Knowledge Network
 Climate Council
 New Zero World

See also 
 Climate crisis
 Climate emergency declaration

References

Works cited

Bibliography

Further reading 

 Kleemann, Katrin, and Jeroen Oomen, eds. “Communicating the Climate: From Knowing Change to Changing Knowledge,” RCC Perspectives: Transformations in Environment and Society 2019, no. 4. doi.org/10.5282/rcc/8822.

 
Environmental communication